Brian d'Arcy James (born June 29, 1968) is an American actor and musician. He is known primarily for his Broadway roles, including Shrek in Shrek The Musical, Nick Bottom in Something Rotten!, King George III in Hamilton, and the Baker in Into the Woods, and has received three Tony Award nominations for his work. On-screen, he is known for his recurring role as Andy Baker on the Netflix series 13 Reasons Why, Officer Krupke in West Side Story, and reporter Matt Carroll in Spotlight.

Early life and education
James was born in Saginaw, Michigan to a wealthy family, the son of Mary (née Kelly), a seller of children's books, and Thomas F. James (deceased), a lawyer. His maternal grandfather was Harry Kelly, a former Governor of Michigan. His uncle, Brian Kelly, was an actor featured in the series Flipper and a producer of the movie Blade Runner. He has three siblings: brother Andrew, a portfolio manager; sister Kate, an actress and writer; and sister Anne (Noonan), an actress and teacher. James is of seventh eighths Irish and one eighth Welsh descent.

James graduated from Northwestern University's School of Communication.

Career
He received a nomination for the Tony Award for Best Featured Actor in a Musical in 2002 for his portrayal of Sidney Falco in Sweet Smell of Success, co-starring John Lithgow. He received an Obie Award for his performance in Conor McPherson's one-man play The Good Thief.

James's additional Broadway credits include Titanic (Frederick Barrett), Lincoln Center's Carousel, and Blood Brothers. His Off-Broadway credits include Andrew Lippa's The Wild Party in 2000 opposite Julia Murney and Idina Menzel, for which he received a Drama Desk Award nomination, as well as Adam Guettel's Floyd Collins and the Gershwins' Pardon My English. He appeared in Martin McDonagh's The Lieutenant of Inishmore on Broadway, replaced Norbert Leo Butz in Dirty Rotten Scoundrels, and starred in The Apple Tree opposite Kristin Chenoweth. In 2004, James released a Christmas album titled From Christmas Eve to Christmas Morn. On Broadway he played Bob Wallace, a character originated by Bing Crosby, in White Christmas in 2004. He played Dan Goodman in the new musical Next to Normal Off-Broadway at Second Stage Theater in 2008. He then starred opposite Daniel Breaker, Sutton Foster, and Christopher Sieber as the titular character in Shrek The Musical. The show began previews on Broadway November 8, 2008, and opened on December 14 at The Broadway Theatre after a tryout in Seattle. For this role he won the Outer Critics Circle Award for Outstanding Actor in a Musical and the Drama Desk Award for Outstanding Actor in a Musical. He was also nominated for the Tony Award for Best Actor in a Musical for his portrayal. He departed the cast after one year in the role and was replaced by Ben Crawford.

James starred in the Broadway play Time Stands Still, which began preview performances on January 5, 2010, and officially opened on January 25 at the Samuel J. Friedman Theatre. The show ended its limited run on March 27, 2010. For this role he won the Broadway.com Audience Award for Favorite Featured Actor in a Play. He reprised the role of Dan Goodman in the Broadway company of Next to Normal at the Booth Theatre. He replaced J. Robert Spencer on May 17, 2010. James ended his limited engagement on July 18, 2010, and was replaced by Jason Danieley.

On July 19, 2010, James performed in front of President Barack Obama and First Lady Michelle Obama at A Broadway Celebration: In Performance at the White House, which also aired on PBS October 20, 2010. He returned to Time Stands Still when the show returned to Broadway. It closed on January 30, 2011. James was part of the cast of the NBC musical series Smash. NBC officially picked up Smash as a series on May 11, 2011. The program made its series premiere on February 6, 2012. He did not return to the show as a series regular for its second and final season. James starred in Torstein Blixfjord's 2012 short film Bird In A Box.

He co-hosted the 57th Drama Desk Awards with Brooke Shields on June 3, 2012. He performed at the 29th birthday celebration of The New York Pops, titled "Journey On", celebrating the work of Stephen Flaherty and Lynn Ahrens; he performed "Wheels of a Dream" from Ragtime. 
James starred as Bick in the musical Giant which ran at the Public Theater from October 26 to December 16, 2012. For this role James received nominations for the Drama Desk Award for Best Actor in a Musical and for the Drama League Award for Distinguished Performance.

He played Banquo in the Lincoln Center Theater production of Macbeth, which began previews in October 2013 and officially opened at the Vivian Beaumont Theater in November 2013. He starred as the original King George III in the Off-Broadway production of the musical Hamilton, with previews starting January 20, 2015, and officially opening on February 17. Actor Jonathan Groff replaced James in the Off-Broadway run on March 3, 2015.

He starred in the Broadway musical Something Rotten!, which opened in previews at the St. James Theatre on March 23, 2015, and officially on April 22, for which he received his third Tony nomination. James played Matt Carroll in the 2015 film Spotlight. In March 2016, James was cast in the CBS pilot Superior Donuts, but his role was recast after the show went through some retooling. He reprised his role as King George III in the Broadway production of Hamilton for a limited engagement that began on April 13, 2017, and continued through July 16, 2017.

In 2017, James played Andy Baker in the Netflix drama series 13 Reasons Why, a role he later reprised in the second season of the show in 2018. Also in 2018, James played pilot Joseph A. Walker in Damien Chazelle's film First Man. In May 2018, it was announced that he would star in the upcoming Fox series Proven Innocent. The following month, however, it was announced that Kelsey Grammer had been cast to replace James in the role of Gore Bellows (previously Cole Bellows).

James starred in the Broadway play The Ferryman at the Bernard B. Jacobs Theatre as Quinn Carney beginning on February 19, 2019, replacing Paddy Considine, who originated the role. In December 2020, it was announced he would appear in the Disney+ miniseries Hawkeye. 

In May 2022, it was announced that James would star as the Baker in a Broadway revival of Into the Woods at the St. James Theatre. He remained with the show through September 4, 2022. James returned to the production on October 25, 2022. He played his final performance on January 1, 2023 when Sebastian Arcelus returned to the show for its final week of performances.

Personal life
James is married to Jennifer Prescott; the two met when they both performed at Lincoln Center. They have one daughter.

Theater credits

Discography

Cast albums
 Into the Woods [Original 2022 Broadway Revival Cast]
 Something Rotten! [Original Broadway Cast]
 Giant [Original Cast]
 Shrek the Musical [Original Broadway Cast]
 White Christmas [Original Cast]
 Sweet Smell of Success [Original Broadway Cast]
 The Wild Party [Original Off-Broadway Cast]
 Titanic [Original Broadway Cast]
 Dream True [World Premiere Cast]
 Brownstone [Studio Cast]
 The Stephen Schwartz Album [Studio Cast]
 Myths and Hymns [Off-Broadway Original Cast]
 Violet [Off-Broadway Original Cast]
 Far From the Madding Crowd [Studio Cast]
 The Civil War [Studio Cast]
 The Stephen Sondheim Album [Studio Cast]
 Floyd Collins [Original Cast]
 Carousel [Revival Cast]
 James and the Giant Peach [Studio Cast]
The Other Josh Cohen [Studio Cast]
A Little More Alive [Demo Complication]

Solo recordings
 From Christmas Eve to Christmas Morn (debut solo album)
 Michigan Christmas (single)

Featured recordings
 The Maury Yeston Compilation (featured artist)
 Jonathan Franzen's How to Be Alone (featured artist)
 Elegies for Angels, Punks and Raging Queens New York (featured artist)

Filmography

Film

Television

Video games

Awards and nominations

References

External links
 
 
 
 
  (archive)

1968 births
Living people
20th-century American male actors
21st-century American male actors
American male film actors
American male musical theatre actors
American male stage actors
American male television actors
American male voice actors
Drama Desk Award winners
Male actors from Michigan
Musicians from Saginaw, Michigan
Northwestern University School of Communication alumni
Outstanding Performance by a Cast in a Motion Picture Screen Actors Guild Award winners
Singers from Michigan
Grammy Award winners